Rostislav of Kiev may refer to:

 Rostislav I of Kiev (c.1110-1167)
 Rostislav II of Kiev  (1173 - before 1214)
 Rostislav III of Kiev (1225-62), Ban of Slavonia and Machva